"Diane" is a song by American band Hüsker Dü for their Metal Circus EP in 1983. The song was written by drummer Grant Hart, and concerns the murder of West St. Paul waitress Diane Edwards by Joseph Ture Jr. in 1980.

Therapy? version

Northern Irish metal band Therapy? covered the song and released it as a single on November 6, 1995, on A&M Records. The song is featured on the Infernal Love album in a radically different arrangement from the original, featuring only cello and vocals. The single reached number 26 in the UK Singles Chart, and number 20 in the Irish Singles Chart. The single went Top 10 in many countries in Europe, winning an award for best single from Humo Magazine in Belgium.

The single was released on CD, CD digipak, CD velvet digipak, red 7" vinyl, and cassette.

Track listing
7" and CD

Tracks 3 & 4 recorded for "Collin's and Maconie's Hit Parade", BBC Radio One.

Velvet digipak CD and cassette

Tracks 2, 3 & 4 recorded by Chris Leckie in Zürich, Switzerland, September 1995.

German double CD digipak

Personnel
Therapy?
 Andy Cairns – vocals
 Fyfe Ewing – backing vocals
 Michael McKeegan – backing vocals

Additional
 Martin McCarrick – cello, backing vocals
 Al Clay – producer (Diane & Misery)
 Anton Corbijn – photography
 Lewis Mulatero – photography
 Phil Knott – photography
 Jeremy Pearce – design
 Simon Carrington – design

References

1995 singles
Therapy? songs
Hüsker Dü songs
1983 songs
A&M Records singles
Songs written by Grant Hart